The 2010 Northern Arizona Lumberjacks football team represented Northern Arizona University as a member of the Big Sky Conference during the 2010 NCAA Division I FCS football season . The Lumberjacks were led by 13th-year head coach Jerome Souers and played their home games at the Walkup Skydome. They finished the season with an overall record of 6–5 and a mark of 4–4 in conference play, placing sixth in Big Sky.

Schedule

References

Northern Arizona
Northern Arizona Lumberjacks football seasons
Northern Arizona Lumberjacks football